Carlton Mitchell (born April 6, 1988) is a former American football wide receiver. He was drafted by the Cleveland Browns of the National Football League (NFL) in the sixth round of the 2010 NFL Draft. He played college football at South Florida.

College career
Mitchell played college football at South Florida, where he was the school's career leader in receiving yards until his record was broken by Andre Davis in 2014. He announced on January 9, 2010 that he would forgo his senior season and enter the 2010 NFL Draft. Mitchell is also a member of Phi Beta Sigma fraternity.

Professional career

Cleveland Browns
Mitchell was drafted by the Cleveland Browns in the sixth round of the 2010 NFL Draft.

In the 2010 NFL Season he played in five games as a rookie. In 2011, he played in eleven games catching three passes.

On August 26, 2012, Mitchell was released by the Browns after being hampered by a leg injury in training camp.

Jacksonville Jaguars
Mitchell was signed by the Jacksonville Jaguars on November 21, 2012.

He was released on November 24, 2012.

Dallas Cowboys
Mitchell signed with the Dallas Cowboys on January 7, 2013. He was released on May 29, 2013.

Tampa Bay Buccaneers
On June 4, 2013, Mitchell signed with the Tampa Bay Buccaneers. On August 26, 2013, he was waived by the Buccaneers.

Edmonton Eskimos
On October 14, 2013 Mitchell signed with the Edmonton Eskimos.

Ottawa Redblacks
In the 2013 CFL Expansion Draft, Mitchell was selected with the 6th pick in the first round.

Atlanta Falcons
Mitchell was a member of the Atlanta Falcons in the 2015 pre-season, but did not survive the finals cuts as he was released on September 5, 2015.

References

External links
 Tampa Bay Buccaneers bio 
 South Florida Bulls bio 
 Official Website 

1988 births
Living people
American football wide receivers
Cleveland Browns players
Dallas Cowboys players
Gaither High School alumni
Jacksonville Jaguars players
Ottawa Redblacks players
Players of American football from Gainesville, Florida
South Florida Bulls football players
Tampa Bay Buccaneers players
Atlanta Falcons players